Guba-Khachmaz Economic Region is one of the 14 economic regions of Azerbaijan. It borders Russia to the north, as well as the economic regions of Shaki-Zagatala, Mountainous Shirvan, and Absheron-Khizi. Its population was estimated to be at 558.7 thousand people in January 2021. The entire territory of the region falls into the geographically European part of Azerbaijan.

Divisions 
Administrative districts of the economic region include Shabran, Khachmaz, Guba, Gusar, and Siyazan.

Geography 

Climate 
The climate of the region has special topographic characteristic with four different zones. Clime types are divided into hot in the plain zones, cold-humid and cold in the mountain zones.

Population 
The total populations of Quba–Khachmaz economic region at the beginning of 2018 was 544,100 people.

Natural resources 
Natural resources of the economic region include oil, natural gas, gravel, sand, flammable shale, clay, and water resources.

Forests cover 10–11% of the region.

Economy 
Agriculture, industry, tourism, and folk art are the main areas of economy in region.

Agriculture 
In the coastal lowlands, grain and vegetable production is common, while the mountainous towns have orchards. Grape, potato and wheat are also main agricultural products. For milk and meat products, animals are raised in lowland areas. In Siyazan and Shabran districts, poultry is common.

Industry 
Manufacturing industries heavily rely on oil and natural gas from Siyazan administrative district.

Tourism 
Main touristic centers in the region are Yalama-Xudat sea shore, Qalaalti treatment center for kidney diseases, Quba, Qusar, and Khachmaz and Shabran for their hunting and fishing opportunities.

Transportation and infrastructure
The region is serviced by railways and highways, oil, gas and water pipelines. The communication lines that connect Russia and Azerbaijan pass through this area. 7.4% of all railways of the republic pass through the territory of the district.

References

External links 
 Ministry of Economy of the Republic of Azerbaijan

Economic regions of Azerbaijan